Leopold Kroll (December 26, 1874 – March 5, 1946) was a missionary bishop of the Missionary District of Liberia. After studies at the General Theological Seminary, he was ordained deacon and priest in 1900. He was consecrated bishop on February 20, 1936, and served in Liberia until 1945. He died in Salisbury, North Carolina.

References 
"Bishop Kroll Buried in Salisbury, N.C." in The Living Church, March 17, 1946, p. 5.

1874 births
1946 deaths
American Episcopalians
Bishops of the Episcopal Church (United States)
General Theological Seminary alumni
Anglican bishops of Liberia